A gemstone (also called a fine gem, jewel, precious stone, semiprecious stone, or simply gem) is a piece of mineral crystal which, in cut and polished form, is used to make jewelry or other adornments. However, certain rocks (such as lapis lazuli, opal, and obsidian) and occasionally organic materials that are not minerals (such as amber, jet, and pearl) are also used for jewelry and are therefore often considered to be gemstones as well. Most gemstones are hard, but some soft minerals are used in jewelry because of their luster or other physical properties that have aesthetic value. Rarity and notoriety are other characteristics that lend value to gemstones.

Apart from jewelry, from earliest antiquity engraved gems and hardstone carvings, such as cups, were major luxury art forms. A gem expert is a gemologist, a gem maker is called a lapidarist or gemcutter; a diamond cutter is called a diamantaire.

Characteristics and classification

The traditional classification in the West, which goes back to the ancient Greeks, begins with a distinction between precious and semi-precious; similar distinctions are made in other cultures. In modern use, the precious stones are emerald, ruby, sapphire and diamond, with all other gemstones being semi-precious. This distinction reflects the rarity of the respective stones in ancient times, as well as their quality: all are translucent with fine color in their purest forms, except for the colorless diamond, and very hard, with hardnesses of 8 to 10 on the Mohs scale. Other stones are classified by their color, translucency, and hardness. The traditional distinction does not necessarily reflect modern values; for example, while garnets are relatively inexpensive, a green garnet called tsavorite can be far more valuable than a mid-quality emerald. Another traditional term for semi-precious gemstones used in art history and archaeology is hardstone. Use of the terms 'precious' and 'semi-precious' in a commercial context is, arguably, misleading in that it suggests certain stones are more valuable than others, when this is not reflected in the actual market value.

In modern times gemstones are identified by gemologists, who describe gems and their characteristics using technical terminology specific to the field of gemology. The first characteristic a gemologist uses to identify a gemstone is its chemical composition. For example, diamonds are made of carbon and rubies of aluminium oxide. Many gems are crystals which are classified by their crystal system such as cubic or trigonal or monoclinic. Another term used is habit, the form the gem is usually found in. For example, diamonds, which have a cubic crystal system, are often found as octahedrons.

Gemstones are classified into different groups, species, and varieties. For example, ruby is the red variety of the species corundum, while any other color of corundum is considered sapphire. Other examples are the emerald (green), aquamarine (blue), red beryl (red), goshenite (colorless), heliodor (yellow), and morganite (pink), which are all varieties of the mineral species beryl.

Gems are characterized in terms of refractive index, dispersion, specific gravity, hardness, cleavage, fracture and luster. They may exhibit pleochroism or double refraction. They may have luminescence and a distinctive absorption spectrum.

Material or flaws within a stone may be present as inclusions.

Gemstones may also be classified in terms of their "water". This is a recognized grading of the gem's luster, transparency, or "brilliance". Very transparent gems are considered "first water", while "second" or "third water" gems are those of a lesser transparency.

Value
 
Gemstones have no universally accepted grading system. Diamonds are graded using a system developed by the Gemological Institute of America (GIA) in the early 1950s. Historically, all gemstones were graded using the naked eye. The GIA system included a major innovation: the introduction of 10x magnification as the standard for grading clarity. Other gemstones are still graded using the naked eye (assuming 20/20 vision).

A mnemonic device, the "four Cs" (color, cut, clarity, and carats), has been introduced to help describe the factors used to grade a diamond. With modification, these categories can be useful in understanding the grading of all gemstones. The four criteria carry different weights depending upon whether they are applied to colored gemstones or to colorless diamonds. In diamonds, the cut is the primary determinant of value, followed by clarity and color. The ideal cut diamond will sparkle, to break down light into its constituent rainbow colors (dispersion), chop it up into bright little pieces (scintillation), and deliver it to the eye (brilliance). In its rough crystalline form, a diamond will do none of these things; it requires proper fashioning and this is called "cut". In gemstones that have color, including colored diamonds, the purity, and beauty of that color is the primary determinant of quality.

Physical characteristics that make a colored stone valuable are color, clarity to a lesser extent (emeralds will always have a number of inclusions), cut, unusual optical phenomena within the stone such as color zoning (the uneven distribution of coloring within a gem) and asteria (star effects). Ancient Greeks, for example, greatly valued asteria gemstones, which they regarded as powerful love charms, and Helen of Troy was supposed to have worn star-corundum.

Aside from the diamond, ruby, sapphire, and emerald, the pearl (not, strictly speaking, a gemstone) and opal have also been considered to be precious. Up to the discoveries of bulk amethyst in Brazil in the 19th century, amethyst was considered a "precious stone" as well, going back to ancient Greece. Even in the last century certain stones such as aquamarine, peridot and cat's eye (cymophane) have been popular and hence been regarded as precious.

Today the gemstone trade no longer makes such a distinction. Many gemstones are used in even the most expensive jewelry, depending on the brand-name of the designer, fashion trends, market supply, treatments, etc. Nevertheless, diamonds, rubies, sapphires, and emeralds still have a reputation that exceeds those of other gemstones.

Rare or unusual gemstones, generally understood to include those gemstones which occur so infrequently in gem quality that they are scarcely known except to connoisseurs, include andalusite, axinite, cassiterite, clinohumite and red beryl.

Gemstone pricing and value are governed by factors and characteristics in the quality of the stone. These characteristics include clarity, rarity, freedom from defects, the beauty of the stone, as well as the demand for such stones. There are different pricing influencers for both colored gemstones, and for diamonds. The pricing on colored stones is determined by market supply-and-demand, but diamonds are more intricate. Diamond value can change based on location, time, and on the evaluations of diamond vendors.

Proponents of energy medicine also value gemstones on the basis of alleged healing powers.

Grading
There are a number of laboratories which grade and provide reports on gemstones.
 Gemological Institute of America (GIA), the main provider of education services and diamond grading reports
 International Gemological Institute (IGI), independent laboratory for grading and evaluation of diamonds, jewelry, and colored stones
 Hoge Raad Voor Diamant (HRD Antwerp), The Diamond High Council, Belgium is one of Europe's oldest laboratories; its main stakeholder is the Antwerp World Diamond Centre
 American Gemological Society (AGS) is not as widely recognized nor as old as the GIA
 American Gem Trade Laboratory which is part of the American Gem Trade Association (AGTA), a trade organization of jewelers and dealers of colored stones
 American Gemological Laboratories (AGL), owned by Christopher P. Smith
 European Gemological Laboratory (EGL), founded in 1974 by Guy Margel in Belgium
 Gemmological Association of All Japan (GAAJ-ZENHOKYO), Zenhokyo, Japan, active in gemological research
 The Gem and Jewelry Institute of Thailand (Public Organization) or GIT, Thailand's national institute for gemological research and gem testing, Bangkok
 Gemmology Institute of Southern Africa, Africa's premium gem laboratory
 Asian Institute of Gemological Sciences (AIGS), the oldest gemological institute in South East Asia, involved in gemological education and gem testing
 Swiss Gemmological Institute (SSEF), founded by Henry Hänni, focusing on colored gemstones and the identification of natural pearls
 Gübelin Gem Lab, the traditional Swiss lab founded by Eduard Gübelin
 Institute for Gems and Gold Research of VINAGEMS (Vietnam), founded by Dr. Van Long Pham

Each laboratory has its own methodology to evaluate gemstones. A stone can be called "pink" by one lab while another lab calls it "padparadscha". One lab can conclude a stone is untreated, while another lab might conclude that it is heat-treated. To minimize such differences, seven of the most respected labs, AGTA-GTL (New York), CISGEM (Milano), GAAJ-ZENHOKYO (Tokyo), GIA (Carlsbad), GIT (Bangkok), Gübelin (Lucerne) and SSEF (Basel), have established the Laboratory Manual Harmonisation Committee (LMHC), for the standardization of wording reports, promotion of certain analytical methods and interpretation of results. Country of origin has sometimes been difficult to determine, due to the constant discovery of new source locations. Determining a "country of origin" is thus much more difficult than determining other aspects of a gem (such as cut, clarity, etc.).

Another important new gemstone that has been rising in popularity is Cuprian Elbaite Tourmaline which are also called "Paraiba Tourmaline". Paraiba tourmaline were first discovered in early 1990 and recently in 2007 in Mozambique, Africa. They are famous for their Glowing Neon Blue Color. Paraiba Tourmaline have become one of the most popular gemstones in recent times thanks to their unique color and recently considered to be one of the important gemstones after Ruby, Emerald and Sapphire according to Gübelin Gemlab. Even though it is a tourmaline, paraiba are considered to be one of the most expensive gemstones.

Gem dealers are aware of the differences between gem laboratories and will make use of the discrepancies to obtain the best possible certificate.

Cutting and polishing

A few gemstones are used as gems in the crystal or other forms in which they are found. Most, however, are cut and polished for usage as jewelry. The two main classifications are stones cut as smooth, dome-shaped stones called cabochons, and stones which are cut with a faceting machine by polishing small flat windows called facets at regular intervals at exact angles.

Stones which are opaque or semi-opaque such as opal, turquoise, variscite, etc. are commonly cut as cabochons. These gems are designed to show the stone's color or surface properties as in opal and star sapphires. Grinding wheels and polishing agents are used to grind, shape and polish the smooth dome shape of the stones.

Gems that are transparent are normally faceted, a method that shows the optical properties of the stone's interior to its best advantage by maximizing reflected light which is perceived by the viewer as sparkle. There are many commonly used shapes for faceted stones. The facets must be cut at the proper angles, which varies depending on the optical properties of the gem. If the angles are too steep or too shallow, the light will pass through and not be reflected back toward the viewer. The faceting machine is used to hold the stone onto a flat lap for cutting and polishing the flat facets. Rarely, some cutters use special curved laps to cut and polish curved facets.

Colors

The color of any material is due to the nature of light itself. Daylight, often called white light, is all of the colors of the spectrum combined. When light strikes a material, most of the light is absorbed while a smaller amount of a particular frequency or wavelength is reflected. The part that is reflected reaches the eye as the perceived color. A ruby appears red because it absorbs all the other colors of white light while reflecting the red.

A material which is mostly the same can exhibit different colors. For example, ruby and sapphire have the same primary chemical composition (both are corundum) but exhibit different colors because of impurities. Even the same named gemstone can occur in many different colors: sapphires show different shades of blue and pink and "fancy sapphires" exhibit a whole range of other colors from yellow to orange-pink, the latter called "padparadscha sapphire".

This difference in color is based on the atomic structure of the stone. Although the different stones formally have the same chemical composition and structure, they are not exactly the same. Every now and then an atom is replaced by a completely different atom, sometimes as few as one in a million atoms. These so-called impurities are sufficient to absorb certain colors and leave the other colors unaffected.

For example, beryl, which is colorless in its pure mineral form, becomes emerald with chromium impurities. If manganese is added instead of chromium, beryl becomes pink morganite. With iron, it becomes aquamarine.

Some gemstone treatments make use of the fact that these impurities can be "manipulated", thus changing the color of the gem.

Treatment
Gemstones are often treated to enhance the color or clarity of the stone. Depending on the type and extent of treatment, they can affect the value of the stone. Some treatments are used widely because the resulting gem is stable, while others are not accepted most commonly because the gem color is unstable and may revert to the original tone.

Heat
Heat can either improve or spoil gemstone color or clarity. The heating process has been well known to gem miners and cutters for centuries, and in many stone types heating is a common practice. Most citrine is made by heating amethyst, and partial heating with a strong gradient results in "ametrine" – a stone partly amethyst and partly citrine. Aquamarine is often heated to remove yellow tones, or to change green colors into the more desirable blue, or enhance its existing blue color to a deeper blue.

Nearly all tanzanite is heated at low temperatures to remove brown undertones and give a more desirable blue / purple color. A considerable portion of all sapphire and ruby is treated with a variety of heat treatments to improve both color and clarity.

When jewelry containing diamonds is heated for repairs, the diamond should be protected with boric acid; otherwise, the diamond, which is pure carbon, could be burned on the surface or even burned completely up. When jewelry containing sapphires or rubies is heated, those stones should not be coated with boric acid (which can etch the surface) or any other substance. They do not have to be protected from burning, like a diamond (although the stones do need to be protected from heat stress fracture by immersing the part of the jewelry with stones in the water when metal parts are heated).

Radiation

The irradiation process is widely practiced in jewelry industry and enabled the creation of gemstone colors that do not exist or are extremely rare in nature. However, particularly when done in a nuclear reactor, the processes can make gemstones radioactive. Health risks related to the residual radioactivity of the treated gemstones have led to government regulations in many countries.

Virtually all blue topaz, both the lighter and the darker blue shades such as "London" blue, has been irradiated to change the color from white to blue. Most green quartz (Oro Verde) are also irradiated to achieve the yellow-green color. Diamonds are mainly irradiated to become blue-green or green, although other colors are possible. When light-to-medium-yellow diamonds are treated with gamma rays they may become green; with a high-energy electron beam, blue.

Waxing/oiling
Emeralds containing natural fissures are sometimes filled with wax or oil to disguise them. This wax or oil is also colored to make the emerald appear of better color as well as clarity. Turquoise is also commonly treated in a similar manner.

Fracture filling
Fracture filling has been in use with different gemstones such as diamonds, emeralds, and sapphires. In 2006 "glass-filled rubies" received publicity. Rubies over 10 carats (2 g) with large fractures were filled with lead glass, thus dramatically improving the appearance (of larger rubies in particular). Such treatments are fairly easy to detect.

Synthetic and artificial gemstones
Synthetic gemstones are distinct from imitation or simulated gems.

Synthetic gems are physically, optically, and chemically identical to the natural stone, but are created in a laboratory. Imitation or simulated stones are chemically different from the natural stone, but may appear quite similar to it; they can be more easily manufactured synthetic gemstones of a different mineral (spinel), glass, plastic, resins, or other compounds.

Examples of simulated or imitation stones include cubic zirconia, composed of zirconium oxide, synthetic moissanite, and un-colored, synthetic corundum or spinels; all of which are diamond simulants. The simulants imitate the look and color of the real stone but possess neither their chemical nor physical characteristics. In general, all are less hard than diamond. Moissanite actually has a higher refractive index than diamond, and when presented beside an equivalently sized and cut diamond will show more "fire".

Cultured, synthetic, or "lab-created" gemstones are not imitations: The bulk mineral and trace coloring elements are the same in both. For example, diamonds, rubies, sapphires, and emeralds have been manufactured in labs that possess chemical and physical characteristics identical to the naturally occurring variety. Synthetic (lab created) corundum, including ruby and sapphire, is very common and costs much less than the natural stones. Small synthetic diamonds have been manufactured in large quantities as industrial abrasives, although larger gem-quality synthetic diamonds are becoming available in multiple carats.

Whether a gemstone is a natural stone or synthetic, the chemical, physical, and optical characteristics are the same: They are composed of the same mineral and are colored by the same trace materials, have the same hardness and density and strength, and show the same color spectrum, refractive index, and birefringence (if any). Lab-created stones tend to have a more vivid color since impurities common in natural stones are not present in the synthetic stone. Synthetics are made free of common naturally occurring impurities that reduce gem clarity or color unless intentionally added in order to provide a more drab, natural appearance, or to deceive an assayer. On the other hand, synthetics often show flaws not seen in natural stones, such as minute particles of corroded metal from lab trays used during synthesis.

List of rare gemstones
 Painite was discovered in 1956 in Ohngaing in Myanmar. The mineral was named in honor of the British gemologist Arthur Charles Davy Pain. In 2005, painite was described by the Guinness Book of World Records as the rarest gem mineral on earth.
 Hibonite was discovered in 1956 in Madagascar. It was named after the discoverer the French geologist Paul Hibon. Gem quality hibonite has been found only in Myanmar.
 Red beryl or bixbite was discovered in an area near Beaver, Utah in 1904 and named after the American mineralogist Maynard Bixby.
 Jeremejevite was discovered in 1883 in Russia and named after its discoverer, Pawel Wladimirowich Jeremejew (1830–1899).
 Chambersite was discovered in 1957 in Chambers County, Texas, US, and named after the deposit's location.
 Taaffeite was discovered in 1945. It was named after the discoverer, the Irish gemologist Count Edward Charles Richard Taaffe.
 Musgravite was discovered in 1967 in the Musgrave Mountains in South Australia and named for the location.
 Grandidierite was discovered by Antoine François Alfred Lacroix (1863–1948) in 1902 in Tuléar Province, Madagascar. It was named in honor of the French naturalist and explorer Alfred Grandidier (1836–1912).
 Poudretteite was discovered in 1965 at the Poudrette Quarry in Canada and named after the quarry's owners and operators, the Poudrette family.
 Serendibite was discovered in Sri Lanka by Sunil Palitha Gunasekera in 1902 and named after Serendib, the old Arabic name for Sri Lanka.
 Zektzerite was discovered by Bart Cannon in 1968 on Kangaroo Ridge near Washington Pass in Okanogan County, Washington, USA. The mineral was named in honor of mathematician and geologist Jack Zektzer, who presented the material for study in 1976.

See also
 Assembled gem
 Gemology
 List of gemstones by species
 List of individual gemstones
 List of diamonds
 List of emeralds by size
 List of sapphires by size
Luminous gemstones

References

External links
 
 
 
 

 
Jewellery components
Materials
Mineralogy

Stone objects